This is a List of TCR International Series drivers. It is reported all drivers who have made at least one race start in the TCR International Series. This list is accurate up to the 2017 Dubai round.

By name

By nationality

Footnotes

References

 
TCR International Series drivers